Niclas Fredriksson (born 24 August 1973) is a former football player from Sweden. He played two seasons for IFK Norrköping but did not receive an extension on his contract. He works with youth players nowadays.

References

External links
 https://web.archive.org/web/20180202190606/http://svenskfotboll.se/superettan/person/?playerid=1154

1973 births
Living people
Swedish footballers
IFK Norrköping players
Association footballers not categorized by position